"An Island" is the third and final single from Chevelle's seventh studio album, La Gárgola. The song debuted on November 19, 2014.

Charts

References

2014 songs
Chevelle (band) songs
Songs written by Pete Loeffler
Songs written by Sam Loeffler
Epic Records singles